Diana Rennik (born 25 March 1985 in Ekaterinburg, Russia) is an Estonian former competitive pair skater. She competed with Aleksei Saks. Together, they are the four times Estonian national champions. They placed 17th at the 2006 Winter Olympics.

Competitive highlights
(with Saks)

References

External links
 

Estonian female pair skaters
Figure skaters at the 2006 Winter Olympics
Olympic figure skaters of Estonia
Living people
1985 births
Sportspeople from Yekaterinburg